Doyald Young (September 12, 1926 – February 28, 2011) was an American typeface designer and teacher who specialized in the design of logotypes, corporate alphabets, lettering and typefaces.

Work
The typefaces designed by Doyald Young include Young Baroque, ITC Éclat, Home Run, and the formal script Young Gallant.

Commissions for logotypes and trademarks include the industrial design firm of Henry Dreyfuss Associates, California Institute of Technology, University of California at Los Angeles, exhibition catalogs for UCLA’s Clark Memorial Library, The Music Center of Los Angeles County, Mattel Toys, Max Factor, Vidal Sassoon and Prudential Insurance. With Don Bartels, designed the font for General Electric Company’s corporate identity program. His life story and working method is profiled in the Lynda.com "Creative Inspirations" video Doyald Young: Logotype Designer.

His entertainment credits include: Liza Minnelli and Frank Sinatra specials, Disney’s 30th Anniversary Celebration, Harry Connick Jr., k.d. lang, Bette Midler, Prince, The Grand Reopening of Carnegie Hall, The Grammy Awards, The Annual Academy of Country Music Awards, The Golden Globe Awards, and The Tony Awards, and most recently, the Art Directors Guild logo.

In later years, he was working on another book, tentatively titled Learning Curves, which was left unfinished with his passing.

Teaching
Young was a teacher at Art Center College of Design, where he taught lettering, logo design, and typographic basics from 1955 to 1978, and again from 1998 until his death in 2011.

Honors
His book Fonts and Logos was awarded a Silver Medal by the Western Art Directors Club, November 2000. In 2001 Art Center College of Design named him Inaugural Master of the School for teaching and his contribution to the field of art and design. In 2009 AIGA awarded him the prestigious AIGA Medal for his contributions to the field of graphic design. On December 18, 2010 Art Center College of Design bestowed on him an honorary Doctorate of Humane Letters.

Death
Young died on February 28, 2011, following complications from cardiac surgery.

Bibliography

See also
 List of AIGA medalists
 List of type designers

References

External links
 "Delphi Press"
 "Doyald Young's website"
 "Doyald Young, Logotype Designer  video portrait"

American graphic designers
American typographers and type designers
1926 births
2011 deaths
Art Center College of Design faculty
AIGA medalists